Museum Rudana or Rudana Art Museum is an art museum in Peliatan, Gianyar Regency, Bali, Indonesia. It was built by Nyoman Rudana, following the concept of the Bali humanist  philosophy of Tri Hita Karana, where art makes a contribution to public wellbeing.

History 

Its blessing ceremony was held on August 11, 1995 as part of the commemoration of the 50th Anniversary of Indonesian Independence with its Golden Indonesian Spirit. President Suharto officially opened it on December 26, 1995.

Architecture 

Nyoman Rudana designed the building, which is three stories tall and built using Balinese architecture and philosophical artifacts.

The outer walls of the museum reflect the national flag of Indonesia: red and white. The red part is made up of red bricks and the white is made up of sandstone.

Collections 

Museum Rudana exhibits more than 400 pieces of fine art and sculpture made by various Indonesian artists. The arrangement of paintings aims to represent a harmony of style in line with the philosophical concept of the building.

On the first and second floor, works of modern Indonesian artists are displayed, including works by Affandi, Basuki Abdullah, Srihadi Soedarsono (best known for his series of Borobudur paintings), Nyoman Gunarsa, and Made Wianta. The works of post-modern Indonesian artists such as Nyoman Erawan and Made Budhiana are also presented. Museum Rudana also has paintings depicting temples in Indonesia such as Besakih in Bali, and Prambanan in Central Java.

On the third floor, various traditional works of traditional Balinese masters from Ubud and Batuan are exhibited, including works by I Gusti Nyoman Lempad and I Gusti Ketut Kobot.

The museum also exhibits the works of foreign artists who reside in Bali, including Don Antonio Blanco (Spain), Yuri Gorbachev (Russia), Jafar Islah (Kuwait) and Iyama Tadayuki (Japan).

Exhibitions 

Museum Rudana has held exhibitions overseas. In 1997 and 1998, while Indonesia was affected by the 1997 Asian financial crisis, it held exhibitions in Kuwait City, Kuwait and in Rome, Italy in 2000, where Nyoman Rudana received the L’albero dell’umanita (The Tree of Humanity) award from the Italian government.

Regular exhibitions are held several times a year, with the biggest one usually taking place in August as a commemoration of its anniversary. The 4th anniversary in 1999 and the 8th in 2004 were commemorated by presenting The Ksatria Seni Awards to fellow artists who dedicated their works for the development of the Indonesian arts.

References

Bibliography
 Mann, Richard, 2006. Treasures of Bali – A Guide to Museums in Bali. Gateway Books International, UK. 
 August 2007, Museum Rudana Buletin (issued commemorating the 12th Anniversary of Museum Rudana).

External links 

 Ubud News, 28 August 2004 Rudana Celebrates with Nahappan
 Bali Discovery Tours 8 Oct 2007 Modern Indonesian Masters : 8 Senior Indonesian Artists Celebrate the 12th Anniversary of Ubud's Museum Rudana in a Joint Exhibition 
 Jakarta Post 23 August 2007 - Museum Rudana marks 12th anniversary

Museums in Bali
Balinese art
Art museums and galleries in Indonesia